Anopinella brasiliana is a species of moth of the family Tortricidae. It is found in Paraguay and Brazil.

The length of the forewings is 8.1–10.1 mm.

Larvae have been reared from the stem of Vernonia species.

External links
Systematic revision of Anopinella Powell (Lepidoptera: Tortricidae: Euliini) and phylogenetic analysis of the Apolychrosis group of genera

Anopinella
Moths of South America
Moths described in 2003